In Jain cosmology, Chakeshvari or Apraticakra is the guardian goddess or Yakshini (attendant deity) of Rishabhanatha. She is the tutelary deity of the Sarawagi Jain community.

Iconography

The color of the goddess is golden. Her Vehicle is the Garuda. She has eight arms. As seen in photos, she is depicted with carrying two Chakras in upper two arms, carrying Trishula/ Vajra, bow, arrow, noose, Elephant goad and last arm as Varadamudra.

Mata Shri Chakreshwari Devi Jain Tirth

In Punjab, at village Attewali there is a famous temple of Goddess Chakreshvari, named Mata Shri Chakreshwari Devi Jain Tirth.

This ancient temple is believed to be around 1000 years old and is situated in village Attewali in Sirhind town on Sirhind-Chandigarh Road. The legend has that during the times of Raja Prithviraj Chauhan, a large number of pilgrims from Rajasthan were going in bullock carts to the ancient Jain Temple of Kangra (H. P.) (still present Kangra Fort) to seek the blessings of Lord Aadinath. The pilgrims had also brought an idol of Mata Chakreshwari Devi, an ardent worshipper (known as Adishthayak Devi or Shasan Devi of Lord Aadinath) of Lord Aadinath. On their way, the caravan halted for the night at Sirhind, the present site of this temple.

Next morning when the caravan was all set to move, the Rath (Chariot) carrying the idol of Mata Shri Chakreshwari Devi did not move despite of the best efforts of the pilgrims. The devotees were at a loss to know the reason and were perplexed. Then all of a sudden, there was flood of light inside the paalki carrying the idol and there was an aakashvani “Let this be my place of Abode”. The pilgrims said `Mother, this is all sandy area, there is no water, around here, we had a miserable night yesterday”. The voice replied, “A few yards towards north of this place dig the land and you will get water”. To the astonishment of pilgrims, they just dug a few feet and a fountain of water started flowing. The pilgrims were very much pleased and they installed the idol of Mata Chakreshwari Devi at this place and built a beautiful temple there. The pilgrims also settled here. The place where a fountain of water had erupted has been developed into a small well known as amrit-kund. Even today, the water of this tank is held sacred by the devotees and they carry home to preserve the same.

Over the years, the place has been converted into a full-fledged place of pilgrimage with facilities of boarding and lodging, although the ancient idol of Mata Chakreshwari Devi remains at its original place. A big temple of Lord Aadinath is under construction in the vicinity. The spiritual powers of Mata Chakreshwari Devi have been depicted very nicely on one of the walls of the temple through very fine glass work in a majestic style.

Every year a fair is held here in the month of Kartik. People, cutting across religions visit this place with great reverence from all over the world in huge numbers every year. The glory of this place is increasing with every passing day. It is worth mentioning here that Diwan Todar Mal Jain, who was an ardent worshipper of Mata Chakreshwari Devi, paid gold coins to the Nawab of Sirhind, Wazir Khan for acquiring land to cremate the bodies of Guru Gobind Singh's mother and two sons, who were done to death in Gurdwara Jyoti Swarup. Sirhind town is situated approximately halfway between Ambala (Haryana) and Ludhiana (Punjab), around 50 km from these stations. The place is easily accessible by road. The temple is situated very near to the famous Gurdwara Jyoti Swarup.

See also 

 Padmavati
 Ambika

Notes

References
 

Heavenly attendants in Jainism
Rishabhanatha